Steinitz's goby (Gammogobius steinitzi) is a species of goby. It is native to the Mediterranean Sea near Marseilles. It has been recently recorded in the Adriatic Sea in Croatia, Tyrrhenian Sea in Italy, and in the Black Sea in Ukraine. Steinitz's goby can reach a length of  SL. Its name honours the marine biologist and herpetologist Heinz Steinitz (1909-1971) of the Hebrew University, Jerusalem.

References 

Gobiidae
Taxa named by Hans Bath
Fish described in 1971
Fish of Europe
Fish of the Mediterranean Sea